Marine Defense Battalions were United States Marine Corps battalions charged with coastal and air defense of advanced naval bases during World War II. They maintained large anti-ship guns, anti-aircraft guns, searchlights, and small arms to repel landing forces.

Organization
Unlike the mobile Marine forces involved in offensive actions, defense battalions were detached to key outposts, in the Pacific and one in Iceland, and remained at the station they defended. Most varied greatly in size and equipment.  The battalions often had several coastal gun batteries, several anti-aircraft batteries, a detection battery (searchlights and radar), and machine gun units. While a few had composite infantry companies attached, most defense battalions were responsible for providing their own riflemen.

A 1939 table of organization and equipment (TOE) included:

HQ Company
Service battery
Six platoons, each with a searchlight and aircraft sound locator
Coast Defense Group
Three batteries, each with two Mark 15 5"/51 caliber guns
Antiaircraft Group
Four AAA gun batteries, each with four mobile 3-inch M3 guns
Two AAA machine gun companies, each with 24 Browning M2 .50-caliber machine guns on AA mounts
Two beach protection machine gun companies, each with 24 Browning M1917A1 water-cooled .30-caliber machine guns

It is likely that the 5"/51 caliber guns were replaced by the 155 mm Long Tom and the 3-inch guns were replaced by the 90 mm Gun M1/M2/M3 by early 1943.

History

The defense battalions were first conceived from the fixed defense concept during the Marine Corps's, as well the United States Navy's, critical change in their traditional sea service role to a more "aggressive" amphibious landing force.  They conducted "fixed" defense exercises on Culebra Island of Puerto Rico throughout the first half of the 20th century, and other areas around the Caribbean.

The first battalions were created in 1939, when the outbreak of World War II caused concerns that overseas bases might be attacked by the Imperial Japanese Navy. In July 1941 the 5th Marine Defense Battalion landed in Iceland as part of the 1st Provisional Marine Brigade alongside the 6th Marine Regiment and other elements of the 2nd Marine Division, augmenting British forces until they departed in September. The battalion had left its Coast Defense Group behind and exchanged the aircraft sound locators for SCR-268 radar sets. In March 1942 the battalion was relieved by the Army's 61st Coast Artillery Regiment. After the attack on Pearl Harbor, where defenders shot down three planes on 7 December 1941, the battalions grew rapidly. On 8 December, the Japanese began an assault on Wake Island, and the defenders, including 399 Marines of the 1st Defense Battalion, surrendered after a prolonged battle on 23 December.

The year 1942 became a period of defense for the Pacific Theater, and as such, the Marine defense battalions saw much reinforcement, redeployment, and growth. On 4 June, the Marines at Midway Island fended off a Japanese aerial attack, which contributed to the victory of the naval battle hundreds of miles away. On 7 August, the 3rd Defense Battalion went ashore with the infantry to Guadalcanal and defended the island (and others in the Solomon Islands) against Japanese counterattacks during the Battle of Guadalcanal.

In the summer of 1943, elements of the 9th, 10th, and 11th Defense Battalions supported the Army's XIV Corps in the central Solomons campaign. Other battalions helped clear the northern islands, including Bougainville, and by the spring of 1944, they were all taken.

In early 1944, the Marshall Islands became the next target in the Pacific, and the Marine defenders moved in. By summer, they landed in the Mariana Islands, including Saipan, and Guam. During that time, Commandant of the Marine Corps Lt. Gen. Alexander Vandegrift began to scale back on defense battalions. Two were disbanded, and the remaining began to gradually focus on anti-aircraft defense, rather than coastal defense. Only the 6th, the 51st, and the 52nd remained designated as defense battalions; the rest had become anti-aircraft units under Fleet Marine Force, Pacific.

In late 1944, the 2nd, 5th, 8th, and 16th Antiaircraft Artillery (formerly Defense) Battalions formed the 1st Provisional Antiaircraft Artillery Group in preparation to invade the Japanese Home Islands. While they did not participate in the Battle of Iwo Jima, they did land on Okinawa in April 1945. Soon after, the Japanese surrender lead to the disbanding of most of the defense battalions.

Marine defense battalions were seen as an ideal unit type for creating and deploying African American units with white leadership, since they trained independently and fought in isolated areas. Those recruits slated for defense battalions were trained at the then-segregated Montford Point, North Carolina (now known as Camp Gilbert H. Johnson, part of the Marine Corps Base Camp Lejeune complex). They would then be assigned to the two black defense battalions, the 51st and 52nd.

List of battalions

See also
 Organization of the United States Marine Corps
 List of United States Marine Corps battalions
 History of ground based air defense in the United States Marine Corps

Notes

References

Bibliography

Web

External links
 Thomas Holcomb and the Advent of the Marine Corps Defense Battalion, 1936–1941

Inactive units of the United States Marine Corps
AAAa